Berindei is a medieval Turkic tribe.

Berindei may also refer to:

Places
Berindei, village in Dăneasa commune, Olt County, Romania

People
 Anton Berindei (1838–1899), Romanian politician and general officer
 Dan Berindei (1923–2021), Romanian historian 
 Mihnea Berindei (1948–2016), Romanian-born French historian 

Romanian-language surnames